Old Norfolk City Hall, also known as the Seaboard Building and U.S. Post Office and Courthouse, is a historic city hall located at Norfolk, Virginia. It was built in 1898–1900, and is a three-story faced with rusticated stone and yellow brick in a Neo-Palladian Revival style.  It features a central pedimented engaged portico with Corinthian order pilasters that contains the main entrance.  The building housed a post office and Federal courts until they moved to the Walter E. Hoffman United States Courthouse about 1935. Title to the building was transferred from the U.S. government to the city of Norfolk in 1937, when it was converted into a city hall.

It was listed on the National Register of Historic Places in 1981. In 2009, it became Norfolk's main library. In 2014, the library was expanded to become the Slover Branch/Downtown Norfolk Public Library; the expansion included construction of a new atrium connecting the former city hall with the neighboring Selden Arcade. The library is named in honor of Samuel L. Slover, former mayor of Norfolk.

References

External links
Official website of current use - Slover Branch/Downtown Norfolk Public Library
U.S. Post Office & Federal Courts Building, 235 East Plume Street, Norfolk, Norfolk, VA: 3 photo, 19 data pages, and 1 photo caption page at Historic American Buildings Survey

Historic American Buildings Survey in Virginia
City and town halls on the National Register of Historic Places in Virginia
Palladian Revival architecture in Virginia
Government buildings completed in 1900
Buildings and structures in Norfolk, Virginia
National Register of Historic Places in Norfolk, Virginia
Downtown Norfolk, Virginia